J.J. Jeffrey (born Joseph Noyes Jeffrey, Jr.) is an American radio executive and a former prominent Top 40 disc jockey. His work aired on United States' rock-and-roll stations during the 1960s and 1970s.

Jeffrey's broadcasting career began in Maine with the help of such broadcasters as Frank Fixaris in the 1950s. By the mid-1960s he was a personality (under the name "Melvin X. Melvin") on Boston's Top 40 rocker, WMEX. After a stint as operations manager (and on-air personality) at WNVY in Pensacola, Florida, he returned to Boston in March 1967 as the afternoon-drive personality for WRKO, which — as NOW Radio and, later, The Big 68 — dominated New England's teen market in the late 1960s.

Jeffrey hosted WRKO's weekly "Now 30" (later called "Big 30") countdowns on Thursdays and was famous for his high-energy style and catch-phrases such as, "This is J.J. Jeffrey, whippin' my great, Greek-god-like body into a frenzy for ya." He left Boston on October 31, 1969, and became the afternoon drive DJ for the leading Top 40 stations in two larger markets: WFIL—Philadelphia, then WLS—Chicago.

In 1975, Jeffrey and his business partner, Bob Fuller, also a former Maine disc jockey, purchased their first radio station, WBLM, an FM album rock outlet based in Lewiston, Maine. They purchased other stations, including northern New England's highly popular country music FM station, WOKQ. Fuller-Jeffrey Broadcasting was sold to Citadel Broadcasting.

After the sale of Fuller-Jeffrey Broadcasting, Jeffrey continued in broadcasting as the owner of Atlantic Coast Radio, which owns and operates three radio stations in the Portland market:
 WLOB 1310 AM News/Talk
 WJJB 96.3 FM, 1440 (WRED) AM Sports station known as The Big Jab carrying Boston Red Sox baseball, Boston Celtics basketball and Portland Pirates ice hockey.
 WPEI 95.9 FM WPPI 95.5 FM, WEEI Multicast

References

https://web.archive.org/web/20070328214945/http://www.maine.rr.com/03/wlob/default.asp

External links
WRKO aircheck (1969)

Year of birth missing (living people)
Living people
American radio personalities
People from Cumberland County, Maine